Cechides is a weevil genus in the tribe Aterpini.

References 

Cyclominae